Dongo may refer to:

Places
Angola
 Dongo, Huíla, a commune and town in Huíla Province
 A former name of Angola itself, specifically
 Kingdom of Ndongo, which preceded Portuguese rule

Central African Republic
Dongo, Central African Republic, a village in Bamingui-Bangoran Prefecture

Democratic Republic of the Congo
Dongo, Democratic Republic of the Congo, a town in Kungu Territory, Sud-Ubangi

Italy
 Dongo, Lombardy, a comune in the Province of Como

Mali
Dongo, Mali, a commune in Youwarou Cercle, Mopti

See also

Donyo

nl:Dongo